Ajwain, ajowan, or Trachyspermum ammi—also known as ajowancaraway, omam  (in Tamil), thymol seeds, bishop's weed, or carom—is an annual herb in the family Apiaceae. Both the leaves and the seed‑like fruit (often mistakenly called seeds) of the plant are consumed by humans. The name "bishop's weed" also is a common name for other plants. The "seed" (i.e., the fruit) is often confused with lovage "seed".

Description

Ajwain's small, oval-shaped, seed-like fruits are pale brown schizocarps, which resemble the seeds of other plants in the family Apiaceae such as caraway, cumin and fennel. They have a bitter and pungent taste, with a flavor similar to anise and oregano. They smell almost exactly like thyme because they also contain thymol, but they are more aromatic and less subtle in taste, as well as being somewhat bitter and pungent. Even a small number of fruits tend to dominate the flavor of a dish.

Cultivation and production
Ajwain tends to grow in regions that are dry and barren. This spice is indigenous to Egypt but is also grown in many parts of South & West Asia, including Iran, India, Pakistan, and other countries. Gujarat and Rajasthan are regions within India that are well known for cultivating ajwain.

Culinary uses
The fruits are rarely eaten raw; they are commonly dry-roasted or fried in ghee (clarified butter). This allows the spice to develop a more subtle and complex aroma. It is widely used in the cuisine of the Indian subcontinent, often as part of a chaunk (also called a tarka), a mixture of spices – sometimes with a little chopped garlic or onion – fried in oil or clarified butter, which is used to flavor a dish at the end of cooking. It is also an important ingredient for herbal medicine practiced there. In Afghanistan, the fruits are sprinkled over bread and biscuits.

Other applications of ajwain include incorporating the seeds in specific types of breads, such as naans and parathas. The seeds can also be used as a mouth freshener when mixed with lemon juice and black pepper and then dried. Or, the seeds can simply be used as an ingredient in hot tea.

As a medication
There is little high-quality clinical evidence that ajwain has anti-disease properties in humans. Ajwain is sold as a dietary supplement in capsules, liquids, or powders.

Ajwain is used in traditional medicine practices, such as Ayurveda, in herbal blends in the belief it can treat various disorders. There is no evidence or regulatory approval that oral use of ajwain in herbal blends is effective or safe.

Adverse effects
Women who are pregnant should not use ajwain due to potential adverse effects on fetal development, and its use is discouraged while breastfeeding. In high amounts taken orally, bishop's weed is considered to be toxic and can result in fatal poisoning.

Essential oil
Hydrodistillation of ajwain fruits yields an essential oil consisting primarily of thymol, gamma-terpinene, p-cymene, and more than 20 trace compounds which are predominantly terpenoids.

References

External links
 Ajwain Archived 9 December 2012.  from The Encyclopedia of Spices

Edible Apiaceae
Antiflatulents
Spices
Plants used in traditional Chinese medicine
Plants used in Ayurveda
Flora of Nepal
Apiaceae
Indian spices